Kim Ji-in (Hangul: 김지인; born 17 September 1996) is a South Korean actress. She is known for her roles in dramas Extraordinary You, So Not Worth It and Level Up.

Filmography

Television series

References

External links
 
 

1996 births
Living people
21st-century South Korean actresses
South Korean television actresses
South Korean web series actresses